Jean Desprez (born Laurette Larocque September 1, 1906; died Montreal, January 27, 1965), was a comedian, journalist, writer, and director in radio and television. She was known as a Quebecois radio personality and dramatist.

Desprez created the Canadian soap opera Jeunesse Dorée, a particular term for affluent, bullying youth. She had an early role in television in Quebec.

References

External links 
 

1906 births
1965 deaths
Journalists from Quebec
Canadian women journalists
Writers from Quebec
Canadian women non-fiction writers